The 1953 Illinois State Normal Redbirds football team represented Illinois State Normal University—now known as Illinois State University—as a member of the Interstate Intercollegiate Athletic Conference (IIAC) during the 1953 college football season. Led by 11th-year head coach Edwin Struck, the Redbirds compiled an overall record of 3–4–2 with a mark of 2–3–1 in conference play, tying for fourth place in the IIAC. Illinois State Normal played home games at McCormick Field in Normal, Illinois.

While the team lost its game against Western Illinois, it was later awarded a win by forfeit due to Western Illinois' use of an ineligible player.

Schedule

References

Illinois State Normal
Illinois State Redbirds football seasons
Illinois State Normal Redbirds football